The 4x4 Beach volleyball World Games Tournament was first Contested in the 1st World Beach Games Event in Qatar, Doha for both genders men and women.

Men's tournament

History

Men, Medals Summary

Women's tournament

History

Women, Medals Summary

References

External link
Results book

Recurring sporting events established in 2019
World Beach Games